Fox Volant of the Snowy Mountain, also known as Flying Fox of Snowy Mountain, is a wuxia novel by Jin Yong (Louis Cha). It was first serialised between 9 February and 18 June 1959 in the Hong Kong newspaper New Evening Post.

Flying Fox of Snowy Mountain is one of Jin Yong's shortest novels, with only 10 chapters. These are numbered instead of having short phrases or duilian as chapter headings, as was Jin Yong's usual style. This is the chronologically latest of Jin Yong's works, being set in the late 18th-century Qing Dynasty.

A prequel, The Young Flying Fox, was released in 1960.

Structure
Fox Volant of the Snowy Mountain is unique in structure among Jin Yong's novels because it employs a frame narrative as well as the literary devices of unreliable narrators and storytelling flashbacks. The actual time frame of the novel lasts only a day, but the stories encapsulated in it stretch back months, years and even decades before.

In the revised afterword to the novel, Jin Yong mentions that he did not draw inspiration from Akira Kurosawa's 1950 film Rashomon as many people had falsely assumed. The literary devices used in the novel have been used very often in literature, such as in One Thousand and One Nights and Illustrious Words to Instruct the World.

Plot
The story begins in the Changbai mountains in northeast China during the reign of the Qianlong Emperor of the Qing dynasty. It follows the classical unity of time, taking place on a single day, which is the 15th day of the third month of the 45th year of the reign of the Qianlong Emperor (i.e. 19 April 1780 in the Gregorian calendar).

A group of martial artists unearth a treasure chest and begin fighting for it. Midway during their tussle, they are overpowered and coerced by a highly skilled monk, Baoshu, to travel to a manor at the top of Jade Brush Peak to help the manor's owner drive away an enemy, "Fox Volant of the Snowy Mountain" Hu Fei. They start telling stories concerning the origin of a precious saber in the chest and their mysterious foe. In doing so, they gradually reveal each other's personal secrets.

The saber's story dates back over a century ago to the feuds of the four bodyguards of the warlord Li Zicheng, who led the rebellion that overthrew the Ming dynasty. The four guards' family names were Hu, Miao, Tian and Fan. Owing to a massive misunderstanding which lasted several generations, their descendants have been slaying each other in a vendetta that prevented any of them from uncovering the truth. The Hu family was opposed to those from the Miao, Tian and Fan families; the latter three were allies.

The people gathered at the manor are either descendants of the four bodyguards or are otherwise embroiled in the feud. Hu Fei's father, Hu Yidao, met Miao Renfeng, a descendant of the Miao family. Both were masterful martial artists without peer. Miao Renfeng, Hu Yidao and his wife developed an uncommon friendship and grew to admire each other, but Hu and Miao must fight unwilling duels to avenge their parents' deaths. Under the schemes of the villain Tian Guinong, Hu Yidao was unintentionally slain by Miao Renfeng when Tian secretly smeared his sword with poison. Hu Yidao's infant son, Hu Fei, was rescued and raised by a waiter, Ping Asi, whose life Hu Yidao once saved. Hu Fei grew up and became a powerful martial artist nicknamed "Fox Volant of the Snowy Mountain".

The various scheming martial artists are eventually punished by their greed. Hu Fei makes an appearance midway in the story.

The conflict reaches a climax when Miao Renfeng challenges Hu Fei to a duel after mistakenly believing that Hu had intentionally molested his daughter, Miao Ruolan. They fight for several rounds but neither emerges the victor. They are stranded on a cliff about to collapse under their weight when the novel ends. Hu Fei has an opportunity to attack Miao Renfeng and knock him off the cliff, but he hesitates because Miao might become his future father-in-law. However, if he does not attack, either they will fall to their deaths or Miao will kill him. The novel ends on a deliberate cliffhanger and leaves the conclusion to the reader's imagination.

Main characters
 Hu Fei, nicknamed "Fox Volant of the Snowy Mountain", is the protagonist of the novel.
 Hu Yidao is a legendary hero from Liaodong. He was highly respected by the ethnic minority tribes living there not only for his prowess in martial arts, but also for his gregarious character. He befriends Miao Renfeng despite the past feuds of their ancestors. He was killed unintentionally by Miao Renfeng.
 Miao Renfeng is a formidable martial artist nicknamed "Golden Faced Buddha". He forged a friendship with Hu Yidao despite the past feuds of their ancestors. He killed Hu Yidao unintentionally and has been feeling guilty about it.
 Miao Ruolan is Miao Renfeng's daughter. She is forbidden to learn martial arts by her father, who does so to remind himself of the guilt of accidentally killing Hu Yidao. She falls in love with Hu Fei.
 Tian Guinong is a descendant of one of the four bodyguards. He is a scheming and unscrupulous person who plots to kill Hu Yidao and Miao Renfeng in his plan to gain a higher social status. He smeared poison on their weapons and indirectly caused the death of Hu Yidao.
 Ping Asi is a young man indebted to Hu Yidao, who once saved his life. He rescued the infant Hu Fei and raised him to repay Hu Yidao's kindness. He is humble and shy and always feels inferior to others.
 Nan Lan is Miao Renfeng's wife and Miao Ruolan's mother. She was born in an aristocrat family so she is spoiled and extravagant. After her marriage to Miao Renfeng, she is unable to cope with his frugal lifestyle and decides to leave with Tian Guinong.

Adaptations

Films

Television
Many of the television adaptations combine the plots of Fox Volant of the Snowy Mountain and The Young Flying Fox.

Radio
In 1981, Hong Kong's RTHK made a 15 episodes radio drama based on the novel.

Video games
Hu Fei was a playable character in the 2008 PC fighting game Street Fighter Online: Mouse Generation.

Translations
An English translation by Olivia Mok was published in 1993, and a second edition came out in 1996.

References

 
1959 novels
Novels by Jin Yong
Novels first published in serial form
Works originally published in Hong Kong newspapers
Novels set in the Qing dynasty
Novels set in the 18th century
Chinese novels adapted into television series